Drei Chöre (Three chorale compositions), Op. 6, is a set of three compositions for mixed choir and piano by Max Reger, composed before 2 August 1892 in Wiesbaden. The texts are poems by three poets:
 Trost 
 Zur Nacht
 Abendbild

History 
Reger composed the three settings before 2 August 1892 in Wiesbaden.

Movements

1 

2 
The text of Zur Nacht (At Night) is a poem by Franz Engel with the incipit "Nun fallen die Augen müde mir zu" (Now my tired eyes close).

3 
The text of Abendbild (Evening Image) is a poem by Nicolaus Lenau beginning with "Friedlicher Abend senkt sich aufs Gefild" (Peaceful evening sinks on the fields).

Performance and recording 
The first and third work were early performed on 11 December 1906 in Charlottenburg, conducted by Lili Menar. The second piece was performed on 22 November 1911 in Berlin, conducted by John Petersen.

The three Chöre were recorded in 2009 in a collection of Reger's choral works, along with the Hebbel Requiem, among others, by the chamber choir Consortium and the pianist Christopher Glynn, conducted by Andrew-John Smith.

Autograph 
The autograph of the work was acquired in 2014 by the Max-Reger-Institute from the dissolved archive of the Schott Verlag in Mainz. Susanne Popp, a Reger scholar and the director of the institute, notes that in Opus 6, Reger noticed reading the proofs from the publisher that his handwriting was a problem because of many dynamic markings in addition to many notes, and that he therefore began to write the dynamics in red, a habit he kept for life. The autograph was presented in an exhibition of the Baden State Library in 2015, in preparation for the Reger Year 2016.

References

Bibliography 
 
 
 
 

Choral compositions
Compositions by Max Reger